The New Media Reader is a new media textbook edited by Noah Wardrip-Fruin and Nick Montfort and published through The MIT Press. The reader features essays from a variety of contributors such as Lev Manovich, Richard Stallman, and Alan Turing. It is currently in use at multiple college campuses including Brown University 
", Duke University, and the University of California at Santa Cruz.

The purpose of this book, as described by the authors, is to articulate the that has often gone unheard and under the radar. They made an extra effort to include illustrations that we originally intended but often neglected in subsequent printings. This book hopes to " assemble a representative collection of critical thoughts, events, and developments...as a new medium, or enabling a new media." By new media they are not referring to new media at this given moment in time, but rather media that was new and original at the time of its introduction. They mention that many times these ideas seemed radical and unorthodox at the time but have paved the way from many modern ideas and the authors hope to "provide understanding and offer fuel for inspiration".

References

External links 
 The New Media Reader on Amazon.com
 New Media from Borges to HTML - Lev Manovich

New media
Media studies textbooks
2003 non-fiction books
Books about the Digital Revolution